Chitosan  is a linear polysaccharide composed of randomly distributed β-(1→4)-linked D-glucosamine (deacetylated unit) and N-acetyl-D-glucosamine (acetylated unit). It is made by treating the chitin shells of shrimp and other crustaceans with an alkaline substance, such as sodium hydroxide.

Chitosan has a number of commercial and possible biomedical uses. It can be used in agriculture as a seed treatment and biopesticide, helping plants to fight off fungal infections. In winemaking, it can be used as a fining agent, also helping to prevent spoilage. In industry, it can be used in a self-healing polyurethane paint coating. In medicine, it is useful in bandages to reduce bleeding and as an antibacterial agent; it can also be used to help deliver drugs through the skin.

Manufacture and properties

Chitosan is produced commercially by deacetylation of chitin, which is the structural element in the exoskeleton of crustaceans (such as crabs and shrimp) and cell walls of fungi. The degree of deacetylation (%DD) can be determined by NMR spectroscopy, and the DD PERCENTAGE in commercial chitosans ranges from 60 to 100%. On average, the molecular weight of commercially produced chitosan is 3800–20,000 daltons.  A common method for obtaining chitosan is the deacetylation of chitin using sodium hydroxide in excess as a reagent and water as a solvent.  The reaction follows first-order kinetics though it occurs in two steps; the activation energy barrier for the first stage is estimated at 48.8 kJ·mol−1 at 25–120 °C and is higher than the barrier to the second stage.

The amino group in chitosan has a pKb value of ~6.5, which leads to significant protonation in neutral solution, increasing with increased acidity (decreased pH) and the %DA-value. This makes chitosan water-soluble and a bioadhesive which readily binds to negatively charged surfaces such as mucosal membranes. The free amine groups on chitosan chains can make crosslinked polymeric networks with dicarboxylic acids to improve chitosan's mechanical properties. Chitosan enhances the transport of polar drugs across epithelial surfaces, and is biocompatible and biodegradable. However, it is not approved by the FDA for drug delivery. Purified quantities of chitosans are available for biomedical applications.

Nanofibrils have been made using chitin and chitosan.

Uses

Agricultural and horticultural use
The agricultural and horticultural uses for chitosan, primarily for plant defense and yield increase,  are based on how this glucosamine polymer influences the biochemistry and molecular biology of the plant cell. The cellular targets are the plasma membrane and nuclear chromatin.  Subsequent changes occur in cell membranes, chromatin, DNA, calcium, MAP kinase, oxidative burst, reactive oxygen species, callose pathogenesis-related (PR) genes, and phytoalexins.

Chitosan was first registered as an active ingredient (licensed for sale) in 1986.

Natural biocontrol and elicitor
In agriculture, chitosan is typically used as a natural seed treatment and plant growth enhancer, and as an ecologically friendly biopesticide substance that boosts the innate ability of plants to defend themselves against fungal infections. The natural biocontrol active ingredients, chitin/chitosan, are found in the shells of crustaceans, such as lobsters, crabs, and shrimp, and many other organisms, including insects and fungi. It is one of the most abundant biodegradable materials in the world.

Degraded molecules of chitin/chitosan exist in soil and water. Chitosan applications for plants and crops are regulated in the USA by the EPA, and the USDA National Organic Program regulates its use on organic certified farms and crops. EPA-approved, biodegradable chitosan products are allowed for use outdoors and indoors on plants and crops grown commercially and by consumers.

In the European Union and United Kingdom, chitosan is registered as a "basic substance" for use as a biological fungicide and bactericide on a wide range of crops. As such, concentrated chitosan solutions can be sold as basic substances to farmers for disease control on both conventional and organic farms.

The natural biocontrol ability of chitosan should not be confused with the effects of fertilizers or pesticides upon plants or the environment. Chitosan active biopesticides represent a new tier of cost-effective biological control of crops for agriculture and horticulture.  The biocontrol mode of action of chitosan elicits natural innate defense responses within plant to resist insects, pathogens, and soil-borne diseases when applied to foliage or the soil. Chitosan increases photosynthesis, promotes and enhances plant growth, stimulates nutrient uptake, increases germination and sprouting, and boosts plant vigor.  When used as a seed treatment or seed coating on cotton, corn, seed potatoes, soybeans, sugar beets, tomatoes, wheat, and many other seeds, it elicits an innate immunity response in developing roots which destroys parasitic cyst nematodes without harming beneficial nematodes and organisms.

Agricultural applications of chitosan can reduce environmental stress due to drought and soil deficiencies, strengthen seed vitality, improve stand quality, increase yields, and reduce fruit decay of  vegetables, fruits and citrus crops . Horticultural application of chitosan increases blooms and extends the life of cut flowers and Christmas trees. The US Forest Service has conducted research on chitosan to control pathogens in pine trees and increase resin pitch outflow which resists pine beetle infestation.
 Chitosan has a rich history of being researched for applications in agriculture and horticulture dating back to the 1980s.  By 1989, chitosan salt solutions were applied to crops for improved freeze protection or to crop seed for seed priming. Shortly thereafter, chitosan salt received the first ever biopesticide label from the EPA, then followed by other intellectual property applications.

Chitosan has been used to protect plants in space, as well, exemplified by NASA's experiment to protect adzuki beans grown aboard the space shuttle and Mir space station in 1997 (see photo left). NASA results revealed chitosan induces increased growth (biomass) and pathogen resistance due to elevated levels of β-(1→3)-glucanase enzymes within plant cells. NASA confirmed chitosan elicits the same effect in plants on earth.

In 2008, the EPA approved natural broad-spectrum elicitor status for an ultralow molecular active ingredient of 0.25% chitosan. A natural chitosan elicitor solution for agriculture and horticultural uses was granted an amended label for foliar and irrigation applications by the EPA in 2009. Given its low potential for toxicity and abundance in the natural environment, chitosan does not harm people, pets, wildlife, or the environment when used according to label directions. Chitosan blends do not work against bark beetles when put on a tree's leaves or in its soil.

Filtration
Chitosan can be used in hydrology as a part of a filtration process. Chitosan causes the fine sediment particles to bind together, and is subsequently removed with the sediment during sand filtration. It also removes heavy minerals, dyes, and oils from the water. As an additive in water filtration, chitosan combined with sand filtration removes up to 99% of  turbidity. Chitosan is among the biological adsorbents used for heavy metals removal without negative environmental impacts.

In combination with bentonite, gelatin, silica gel, isinglass, or other fining agents, it is used to clarify wine, mead, and beer. Added late in the brewing process, chitosan improves flocculation, and removes yeast cells, fruit particles, and other detritus that cause hazy wine.

Winemaking and fungal source chitosan
Chitosan has a long history for use as a fining agent in winemaking. Fungal source chitosan has shown an increase in settling activity, reduction of oxidized polyphenolics in juice and wine, chelation and removal of copper (post-racking) and control of the spoilage yeast Brettanomyces. These products and uses are approved for European use by the EU and OIV standards.

Wound management
Chitosan based wound dressings have been widely explored for a variety of acute and chronic wounds. Chitosan has the ability to adhere to fibrinogen, which produces increased platelet adhesion, causing clotting of blood and hemostasis. Chitosan hemostatic agents are salts made from mixing chitosan with an organic acid (such as succinic or lactic acid). Chitosan may have other properties conducive to wound healing, including antibacterial and antifungal activity, which remain under preliminary research. 

Chitosan is used within some wound dressings to decrease bleeding. Upon contact with blood, the bandage becomes sticky, effectively sealing the laceration.  Chitosan hydrogel-based wound dressings have also been found useful as burn dressings, and for the treatment of chronic diabetic wounds and hydrofluoric acid burns.

Chitosan-containing wound dressings received approval for medical use in the United States in 2003.

Temperature-sensitive hydrogels
Chitosan is dissolved in dilute organic acid solutions but is insoluble in high concentrations of hydrogen ions at pH 6.5 and is precipitated as a gel-like compound. Chitosan is positively charged by amine groups, making it suitable for binding to negatively charged molecules. However, it has disadvantages such as low mechanical strength and low-temperature response rate; it must be combined with other gelling agents to improve its properties. Using glycerolphosphate salts (possessing a single anionic head) without chemical modification or cross-linking, the pH-dependent gelation properties can be converted to temperature-sensitive gelation properties. In the year 2000, Chenite was the first to design the temperature-sensitive chitosan hydrogels drug delivery system using chitosan and β-glycerol phosphate. This new system can remain in the liquid state at room temperature, while becoming gel with increasing temperature above the physiological temperature (37 °C). Phosphate salts cause a particular behaviour in chitosan solutions, thereby allowing these solutions to remain soluble in the physiological pH range (pH   7), and they will be gel only at body temperature. When the liquid solution of chitosan-glycerol phosphate, containing the drug, enters the body through a syringe injection, it becomes a water-insoluble gel at 37 °C. The entrapped drug particles between the hydrogel chains will be gradually released.

Research
Chitosan and derivatives have been explored in the development of nanomaterials, bioadhesives, wound dressing materials, improved drug delivery systems, enteric coatings, and in medical devices. Among chitosan derivatives in particular thiolated chitosans have shown potential for various medicinal applications. Numerous products containing this thiolated polymer (thiomer) have already reached the global market.
Chitosan nanofiber membranes  have a high degree of biocompatibility and may support new bone formation. Chitosan-derived metallic nanomaterials are under study for wound healing. Chitosan is under research as an adjuvant for a potential intranasal vaccine delivery method.

Bioprinting

Bioinspired materials, a manufacturing concept inspired by natural nacre, shrimp carapace, or insect cuticles, has led to development of bioprinting methods to manufacture large scale consumer objects using chitosan. This method is based on replicating the molecular arrangement of chitosan from natural materials into fabrication methods, such as injection molding or mold casting. Once discarded, chitosan-constructed objects are biodegradable and non-toxic. The method is used to engineer and bioprint human organs or tissues.

Pigmented chitosan objects can be recycled, with the option of reintroducing or discarding the dye at each recycling step, enabling reuse of the polymer independently of colorants. Unlike other plant-based bioplastics (e.g. cellulose, starch), the main natural sources of chitosan come from marine environments and do not compete for land or other human resources.

Weight loss 
Chitosan is marketed in a tablet form as a "fat binder". Although the effect of chitosan on lowering cholesterol and body weight has been evaluated, the effect appears to have no or low clinical importance. Reviews from 2016 and 2008 found there was no significant effect, and no justification for overweight people to use chitosan supplements. In 2015, the U.S. Food and Drug Administration issued a public advisory about supplement retailers who made exaggerated claims concerning the supposed weight loss benefit of various products.

Biodegradable antimicrobial food packaging 
Microbial contamination of food products accelerates the deterioration process and increases the risk of foodborne illness caused by potentially life-threatening pathogens. Ordinarily, food contamination originates superficially, requiring surface treatment and packaging as crucial factors to assure food quality and safety. Biodegradable chitosan films have potential for preserving various food products, retaining their firmness and restricting weight loss due to dehydration. In addition, composite biodegradable films containing chitosan and antimicrobial agents are in development as safe alternatives to preserve food products.

Battery electrolyte
Chitosan is being investigated as an electrolyte for rechargeable batteries with good performance and low environmental impact due to rapid biodegradability, leaving recycleable zinc. The electrolyte has excellent physical stability up to 50 °C, electrochemical stability up to 2 V with zinc electrodes, and accommodates redox reactions involved in the Zn-MnO2 alkaline system.  results were promising, but the battery needed testing on a larger scale and under actual use conditions.

References

External links
 International research project Nano3Bio, focused on tailor-made biotechnological production of chitosans (funded by the European Union)

Antihemorrhagics
Biopesticides
Elicitors
Polysaccharides